Mahajot is a political alliance of secular and democratic parties in Indian state of Assam.

2021 Assam election
Ten political parties formed a political alliance in the run-up for 2021 Assam Legislative Assembly election. But onlu eight of them including Indian National Congress, All India United Democratic Front, Bodoland People's Front, Communist Party of India (Marxist), Communist Party of India, Communist Party of India (Marxist–Leninist) Liberation, Anchalik Gana Morcha and Rashtriya Janata Dal came into a seat sharing agreement for dethroning the incumbent BJP government. However the alliance was unable to defeat the BJP and its allies, but it gained 43.68% of the total votes polled and got 50 seats.

After the election, Bodoland People's Front left the alliance and All India United Democratic Front was expelled by Indian National Congress.

Current members

References

Political party alliances in India